Susan Gritton (born 31 August 1965) is an English operatic soprano. She was the 1994 winner of the Kathleen Ferrier Award and has sung leading roles in a wide-ranging repertoire from Handel and Mozart to Britten, Janáček and Strauss.

Life and career
Gritton was born in Reigate, Surrey.  She was educated at the University of Oxford and the University of London, where she studied Botany.

On the operatic stage, her roles include Ellen Orford Peter Grimes (La Scala, Sydney & Tokyo); Blanche Dialogues des Carmélites (Bayerische Staatsoper); Countess Madeleine Capriccio and Tatyana Eugene Onegin (Grange Park); Micaela Carmen and Liù Turandot (Covent Garden); Donna Anna Don Giovanni (Bolshoi & Opera de Montreal & Scottish Opera); Elettra Idomeneo (Netherlands Opera) and Konstanze Die Entführung aus dem Serail (Deutsche Staatsoper & Bayerische Staatsoper).  Title roles include Theodora (Glyndebourne); Rodelinda (Bayerische Staatsoper); The Bartered Bride (Covent Garden) and The Cunning Little Vixen (ENO).

On the concert platform her work spans many periods and styles and includes Ravel's Shéhérazade (RLPO/Mackerras); Brahms' Ein Deutsches Requiem (Berlin Philharmonic/Rattle & Philharmonia/von Dohnànyi); Berg's Bruchstücke aus Wozzeck (Swedish Radio Orchestra/Harding) and Honegger's Jeanne d'Arc au bûcher (Accademia Nazionale di Santa Cecilia/Pappano). Other highlights include Handel's Messiah (ROH Orchestra/Pappano); Elgar's The Kingdom (LSO/Elder); Shostakovich's Blok Romances (Nash Ensemble); Schumann's Das Paradies und die Peri at the Edinburgh Festival (SCO/Norrington) and in Vienna (Vienna Philharmonic/Rattle) and Britten's Les Illuminations – including the world premiere of Britten's three additional Rimbaud settings (BBCSSO/Brabbins).  A Grammy nominated artist, she has recorded prolifically for Chandos, Hyperion, Deutsche Grammophon, EMI, Decca, Philips and Collins Classics among others.

Gritton is married to the opera director Stephen Medcalf.

Roles

Barbarina in Mozart's The Marriage of Figaro at Glyndebourne Festival Opera
Blanche in Poulenc's Dialogues des Carmélites at Bayerische Staatsoper
Cleopatra in Handel's Giulio Cesare at Bayerische Staatsoper
Contessa in Mozart's The Marriage of Figaro at English National Opera
Donna Anna in Mozart's Don Giovanni at Bolshoi, Opera de Montreal, Scottish Opera
Ellen Orford in Britten's Peter Grimes at La Scala, Sydney, Tokyo
Elettra in Mozart's Idomeneo at Netherlands Opera
Female Chorus in Britten's The Rape of Lucretia at Snape Maltings
Fiordiligi in Mozart's Così fan tutte at Mostly Mozart Festival, English National Opera, Bayerische Staatsoper
Governess in Britten's The Turn of the Screw at Snape Maltings
Konstanze in Mozart's Die Entführung aus dem Serail at Berlin State Opera, Bayerische Staatsoper
Liù in Puccini's Turandot at the Royal Opera House
Madeleine in Richard Strauss's Capriccio at Grange Park Opera
Marenka in Smetana's The Bartered Bride at the Royal Opera House
Marzelline in Beethoven's Fidelio at Teatro dell'Opera di Roma
Micaela in Bizet's Carmen at the Royal Opera House
Pamina in Mozart's The Magic Flute at English National Opera
Rodelinda in Handel's Rodelinda at Bayerische Staatsoper
Romilda in Handel's Xerxes at Bayerische Staatsoper
Theodora in Handel's Theodora at Glyndebourne Festival Opera
Tatyana in Tchaikovsky's Eugene Onegin at Grange Park Opera
Tytania in Britten's A Midsummer Night's Dream at Teatro la Fenice
Vitellia in Mozart's La clemenza di Tito at Bayerische Staatsoper
Vixen in Janáček's The Cunning Little Vixen at English National Opera
Miss Wordsworth in Britten's Albert Herring at Glyndebourne Festival Opera

Discography

Beethoven Ah perfido! London Chamber Orchestra, Christopher Warren Green (Signum)
Beethoven 9th Symphony BBC National Orchestra of Wales, Francois-Xavier Roth (BBC Music Magazine Vol. 16 No. 7)
Beethoven Vestas Feuer Sir Andrew Davis (Deutsche Grammophon, Beethoven Edition Vol. 3)
Berlioz  Béatrice et Bénédict (Hero) LSO, Sir Colin Davis (LSO LIVE)
Brahms  Ein Deutsches Requiem Choir of King's College Cambridge, Stephen Cleobury (EMI)
Brian  Gothic Symphony BBC National Orchestra of Wales, etc. Martyn Brabbins (Hyperion)
Britten Albert Herring (Miss Wordsworth) Northern Sinfonia, Stuart Bedford (Naxos)
Britten Les Illuminations BBC Symphony Orchestra, Edward Gardner (Chandos
Britten Paul Bunyan (Tiny) Royal Opera House Chorus & Orchestra, Richard Hickox (Chandos)
Britten's Purcell Realizations Graham Johnson, piano (Hyperion)
Britten The Poet's Echo Iain Burnside, piano (Signum)
Britten Sechs Hölderlin-Fragmente Iain Burnside, piano (Signum)
Elgar etc. Her Song BBC Concert Orchestra, Martyn Brabbins (Dutton)
Elgar Spirit of England BBC Symphony Orchestra, David Lloyd Jones (Dutton)
Finzi Dies natalis BBC Symphony Orchestra, Edward Gardner (Chandos)
Gluck Paride ed Elena (Elena) Gabrielli Consort & Players, Paul McCreesh (Deutsche Grammophon)
Górecki Symphony No. 3 Philharmonic Orchestra, Yuri Simonov (Regis)
Handel L'Allegro, il Penseroso ed il Moderato The King's Consort, Robert King (Hyperion)
Handel The Choice of Hercules (Pleasure) The King's Consort, Robert King (Hyperion)
Handel Deborah (Jael) The King's Consort, Robert King (Hyperion)
Handel Israel in Egypt King's College Choir, Stephen Cleobury (Decca)
Handel Messiah Gabrielli Consort & Players, Paul McCreesh (Deustsche Grammophon)
Handel Messiah LSO, Sir Colin Davis (LSO Live)
Handel Messiah Ensemble Matheus, Jean-Christophe Spinosi (DVD, Unitel Classic)
Handel The Occasional Oratorio The King's Consort, Robert King (Hyperion)
Handel Saul (Merab) Gabrielli Consort & Players, Paul McCreesh (Deustsche Grammophon)
Handel Solomon (Queen of Sheba) Gabrielli Consort & Players, Paul McCreesh (Deustsche Grammophon0
Handel Solomon (Solomon's Queen, First Harlot) Berlin RIAS Chamber Chorus, Daniel Reuss (Harmonia Mundi)
Handel Theodora (Theodora) Gabrielli Consort & Players, Paul McCreesh (Deutsche Grammophon)
Toivo Kuula Orchestral Songs BBC Concert Orchestra, Martyn Brabbins (Dutton Epoch)
Medtner Goethe Lieder Geoffrey Tozer, piano (Chandos)
Fanny Mendelssohn Lieder Eugene Asti, piano (Hyperion)
Felix Mendelssohn Paulus BBC National Orchestra, Richard Hickox (Chandos)
Mozart Exsultate, jubilate St John's Sinfonia, Andrew Nethsingha (Chandos)
Mozart Porgi amor, Dove sono London Chamber Orchestra, Christopher Warren Green (Signum
Mozart Requiem Scottish Chamber Orchestra, Sir Charles Mackerras (Linn)
Mozart Ruhe sanft, meine holdes Leben Classical Opera Company, Ian Page (Sony)
Poulenc Dialogues des Carmelites (Blanche) Bayerisches Staatsorchester, Kent Nagano (DVD, Bel Air Classics
Poulenc Gloria Polyphony, Britten Sinfonia, Stephen Layton (Hyperion)
Schubert Mass in E flat major (D 950) Collegium Musicum 90, Richard Hickox (Chandos)
Smetana The Bartered Bride (Marenka) Philarmonia, Sir Charles Mackerras (Chandos)
Shostakovich  Sem Stikhotvoreniy A Bloka Florestan Trio (Hyperion)
Verdi Falstaff (Nanetta) English Opera Orchestra, Paul Daniel (Chandos)
Vaughan Williams  A Sea Symphony LSO, Richard Hickox (Chandos)
Vaughan Williams  Sir John in Love (Anne Page) Northern Sinfonia, Richard Hickox (Chandos)
Vivaldi Ottone in Villa (Cleonilla) Collegium Musicum 90, Richard Hickox (Hyperion)

Prizes and awards
1994 Kathleen Ferrier Award
2003 International Handel Recording Prize for Handel's The Choice of Hercules
2003 Gramophone Award for Johann Nepomuk Hummel, Masses

References

External links
Susan Grittonat Askonas Holt Artists Management 

1965 births
Living people
English operatic sopranos
People from Reigate
Alumni of the University of London
Alumni of the University of Oxford
20th-century British women opera singers
21st-century British women opera singers
Musicians from Surrey